The International Journal of Mass Spectrometry is a monthly peer-reviewed scientific journal covering all aspects of mass spectrometry, including instrumentation and applications in biology, chemistry, geology, and physics. It was established in 1968 as the International Journal of Mass Spectrometry and Ion Physics and was renamed International Journal of Mass Spectrometry and Ion Processes in 1983, before obtaining its current title in 1998. It is published by Elsevier and the editors-in-chief are Julia Laskin (Purdue University) and Zheng Ouyang (Tsinghua University).

Abstracting and indexing
The journal is abstracted and indexed in:
Chemical Abstracts Service
Current Contents/Physical, Chemical & Earth Sciences
EBSCO databases
Embase
Food Science and Technology Abstracts
FRANCIS
Inspec
PASCAL
Science Citation Index Expanded
Scopus
According to the Journal Citation Reports, the journal has a 2020 impact factor of 1.986.

References

External links

Mass spectrometry journals
Elsevier academic journals
Monthly journals
Publications established in 1968
English-language journals